Bojoscutellum is a genus of trilobites in the order Corynexochida family Styginidae.

These trilobites were nektobenthic carnivore. They lived in the Devonian period in the Eifelian age (395 million years ago).

Distribution
Devonian of the Czech Republic and Morocco.

Species
 Bojoscutellum angusticeps † (Barrande, 1852)
 Bojoscutellum conspersum † (Prantl, 1949)
 Bojoscutellum crassicostatum † Šnajdr, 1960
 Bojoscutellum havliceki † (Vaněk, 1970)
 Bojoscutellum intermixtus † (Hawle et Corda, 1847)
 Bojoscutellum ivanense † (Barrande, 1852)
 Bojoscutellum koneprusiense † Šnajdr, 1960
 Bojoscutellum meridianum † (Barrois, 1886)
 Bojoscutellum paliferum † (Beyrich, 1845)
 Bojoscutellum pseudopaliferum † Šnajdr, 1960
 Bojoscutellum sieberi † (Hawle et Corda, 1847)
 Bojoscutellum tjazovae † Maksimova, 1979
 Bojoscutellum transversum † (Hawle et Corda, 1847)
 Bojoscutellum uralicum † Maksimova, 1979

Gallery

References
Biolib
Paleobiology Database
Sepkoski, Jack Sepkoski's Online Genus Database – Trilobita
Genus Bojoscutellum at Bvi.rusf.ru

Styginidae
Corynexochida genera
Fossils of Morocco
Fossils of the Czech Republic
Devonian trilobites